Tongling Nonferrous Metals Group Holding Company Limited is a state-owned enterprise involving in extracting copper resources and smelting copper and other non-ferrous metals. It was founded in 1949 in Tongling, Anhui, China and it was put into production in 1952. It is one of the largest copper smelting companies in the country.

The subsidiary and listed company of Tongling Nonferrous Metals Group Holdings Company Limited, Tongling Nonferrous Metals Group Company Limited, was established in 1992 and listed on the Shenzhen Stock Exchange in 1996 .

See also
 Jinduicheng Molybdenum
 China Molybdenum

References

External links
Tongling Nonferrous Metals Group Holding Company Limited 
Tongling Nonferrous Metals Group Company Limited

Non-renewable resource companies established in 1949
Companies based in Anhui
Government-owned companies of China
Metal companies of China
Companies listed on the Shenzhen Stock Exchange
1949 establishments in China
1985 mergers and acquisitions
1998 mergers and acquisitions
2000 mergers and acquisitions
2008 mergers and acquisitions
2017 mergers and acquisitions